Aeropuma, S.A., also known as AeroPuma, was a Salvadoran airline that commenced operations in 1985. The airline operated for around 12 years before it went defunct in 1997.

See also 

 List of defunct airlines of El Salvador

References 

Defunct airlines of El Salvador
Airlines established in 1985
Airlines disestablished in 1997